Tyrone Albert Franklin Ezell is an American football defensive end for the Lehigh Valley Steelhawks of the National Arena League (NAL). He went undrafted in 2014 but was signed after the draft by the Houston Texans.

College
Ezell played in all 13 games, 12 as a starter, where he collected 34 tackles. In his final game, he sacked the opposing team's quarterback that all but won the game for Pitt 30-27

Pro career

Houston Texans

Ezell signed as an undrafted free agent right after the 2014 NFL draft, joining college teammate Tom Savage.

Wrestling career
Ezell said he wanted to be a WWE wrestler if he couldn't make an NFL team.

References

Living people
1990 births
American football defensive tackles
Pittsburgh Panthers football players
Lehigh Valley Steelhawks players